Grünsfeld is a town and a municipality in the Main-Tauber district, in Baden-Württemberg, Germany. It is situated 6 km east of Tauberbischofsheim, and 25 km southwest of Würzburg. It consists of the villages Grünsfeld, Grünsfeldhausen, Krensheim, Kützbrunn, Paimar, and Zimmern.

Local council (Gemeinderat)
Elections were held in May 2014:

Mayors
 1985–2013: Alfred Beetz (CDU)
 since 2013: Joachim Markert (CDU)

Sons and daughters of the city 

  1470, John IV, Landgrave of Leuchtenberg, † 1 September 1531, Landgraf of  Leuchtenberg
  17 June 1855, Fritz Steinbach, † August 13, 1916, Brahms conductor and composer

References

Main-Tauber-Kreis
Historic Jewish communities